The Guangfo Metro or Guangfo line is a intercity metro line that connects the Chinese cities Foshan and Guangzhou.

History
The line was expected to start construction in 2002 with a tentative opening in 2009. However, due to capital shortage, its construction was claimed to be suspended until it resumed in 2007. The Xilang–Yangang section began operation on December 28, 2015.

Since 24 April 2016, Wi-Fi is available across the entire line.

Future Development

Guangzhou section
The extension will be  in length.

Opening timeline

Stations

Rolling stock

References

External links

Official Site of FMetro 

Foshan
Transport in Guangzhou
Guangzhou Metro
Foshan Metro lines
Rail transport in Guangdong
Railway lines opened in 2010
Foshan Metro